Lionel Moret (born 16 January 1977) is a retired Swiss football defender.

References

1977 births
Living people
Swiss men's footballers
FC Monthey players
Neuchâtel Xamax FCS players
FC Sion players
Association football defenders
Swiss Super League players